Sportklub Sofia is a defunct Bulgarian sports club based in Sofia. During its existence it won the Bulgarian Championship once, in 1935.

History
The club was formed as SC Karavelov in 1 December 1912 in honour of Lyuben Karavelov, a Bulgarian writer and an important figure of the Bulgarian National Revival.

During 1919 to September 1920 the club was merged with Slavia Sofia. However, misunderstanding in the management of both clubs let to the separation of the team. The club was then renamed to Sportklub Sofia, as suggested by Aleksandar Vazov, nephew of Ivan Vazov. Aleksandar, who as a student in Germany used to play for Sportclub Berlin, known today as Hertha BSC. With the establishment of Communist rule in Bulgaria after WWII, significant changes took place affecting all leading clubs without exception. On 5 November 1944, Sportklub Sofia was merged with Sokol Sofia and Vazrazhdane Sofia and a new club was found on Sportklub Sofia's basis –  Septemvri Sofia, who is also Its official descendant.

Honours
Bulgarian State Football Championship:
 Winners: 1935

References

Association football clubs established in 1912
Association football clubs disestablished in 1944
Defunct football clubs in Bulgaria
Football clubs in Sofia
1912 establishments in Bulgaria
1944 disestablishments in Bulgaria